The following is a list of the MTV Europe Music Award winners and nominees for Best Greek Act. Viewers vote online, and the winner of this award is then entered in the running for the Best European Act, which is then further narrowed down by online voters to five acts.

Winners and nominees
Winners are listed first and highlighted in bold.

2000s

2010s

References

MTV Europe Music Awards
Greek music awards
Awards established in 2008